Groove FM may refer to the following radio stations:
 CJGV-FM, in Winnipeg, Canada
 Groove FM (New Zealand)
 Groove 101.7FM, in Perth, Australia